Prince Alexander of Georgia (aleksandre batonishvili) (1770–1844) was a Georgian royal prince (batonishvili) of the Bagrationi family, who headed several insurrections against the Russian rule in Georgia. He was known as Eskandar Mīrzā in Persia, tsarevich Aleksandr Irakliyevich in Russia, and Alexander Mirza in Western Europe.

Alexander was a son of the penultimate king of the Kingdom of Kartli and Kakheti in eastern Georgia, Heraclius II, who entrusted him various military and administrative tasks. After the death of Heraclius in 1798, he opposed the accession of his half-brother George XII and the new king's renewed quest for Russian protection. After the Russian annexation of Georgia in 1801, Alexander fled the country and spent decades in a series of attempts to undermine the Russian control of his homeland. Eventually, Alexander's reliance on the Persian support and North Caucasian mercenaries deprived him of popular support. After his last major rebellion was defeated in 1812, Alexander permanently settled in Persia, where he died in obscurity in 1844.

Early life 

Alexander was a son of Heraclius II (Erekle), king of Kartli and Kakheti in eastern Georgia, and his third wife Darejan Dadiani. He was educated by the Catholic missionaries at the court of his father. At age 12 or 13, he was tutored by and served as an aide to the Tiflis-based German adventurer and physician Jacob Reineggs, who played a role in the Russian–Georgian diplomacy until his retirement to the Russian Empire in 1783. Alexander became involved in the politics and administration of his country at a very young age. In 1793, he was entrusted by Heraclius with the government of the district of Kazakh and in 1794 he was invested with the appanage in Somkhiti. Around the same time, Alexander was present with the army sent by Heraclius in support of his grandson, King Solomon II of Imereti, against his rival David.
In 1795, Alexander led a Georgian contingent dispatched to help the allied Ibrahim Khalil Khan of Karabakh against the Iranian encroachment. In June, the allies fought back a 20,000-strong force sent by Agha Mohammad Khan Qajar against Karabakh. Back in Georgia, in July 1795, Alexander raised a force of Turkic mercenaries brought from Karabakh against the anticipated Iranian advance. Fighting by his father's side, Alexander witnessed the sack of Tiflis in a disastrous attack by Agha Mohammad Khan Qajar, who resented Heraclius's rapprochement with the Russian Empire and demanded Georgia's reversal to traditional allegiance to Iran. Disappointed by his failure, Heraclius, then over 75, retired to his native Telavi, leaving Alexander in charge of restoring Tiflis.

Break with George XII 

After the death of Heraclius in 1798, Alexander, together with his mother Darejan and brother Iulon, led opposition to the accession of his half-brother, George XII. The conflict between the sons of Heraclius had already been brewing  during their father's lifetime, and now evolved into an open confrontation. Alexander occupied the Muslim-majority districts of Kazakh, Borchalo, and Shamshadil, and refused to obey the new king. Being in ill-health and weakened, George XII relied on the Russian protection. Alexander, suspecting that the Russian presence in the country would eventually lead to an outright annexation, was persuaded by the shah of Iran, Fath Ali Shah Qajar, to leave Georgia and join his forces with Omar Khan, the ruler of the Avars in Dagestan and an erstwhile enemy of Heraclius II, in 1799.

Fath Ali rewarded Alexander's defection by promising to support his claim to the Georgian throne. Alexander began raising an army and issued an appeal to the people of Kartli and Kakheti, trying to justify his new alliance with the traditional foes of the Georgians and swearing by the grave of Saint Nino that the Avar army was being assembled not to ravage the country, but to defend Alexander's right to the throne. At the same time, he sent letters to his mother and brothers, assuring that they would be saved from the Russian oppression.

In November 1800, Alexander and Omar Khan led their forces into Kakheti, but they were met and decisively defeated by a combined Russo-Georgian army on the banks of the Iori river on 7 November 1800. Wounded in action, Omar Khan retreated to the mountains of Dagestan, while Alexander and his followers fled to Ibrahim Khalil Khan of Karabakh, and then to Dagestan. In the meantime, the defeat of his allies convinced Fath Ali not to proceed with his planned invasion of Georgia and he recalled his army to Tabriz. Declared by the Russians a traitor to be taken dead or alive, Alexander thus began three decades of resistance.

Struggle against Russia

Russo-Persian war 
After King George XII's death in December 1800, the Russian government prevented his heir Prince David from assuming the throne and brought Kartli and Kakheti more closely under its control. On 12 September 1801, Tsar Alexander I of Russia issued a manifesto, declaring the Georgian monarchy abolished and imposing a Russian administration. As the Russians began deporting the Georgian royal family members to Russia proper, many princes openly revolted. Alexander's brothers, Iulon and Parnaoz, fled to Solomon II, King of Imereti in western Georgia, while his half-nephew Teimuraz, a son of the late king George XII and the future historian, joined him in Dagestan.

In 1803, Alexander attempted to win over the newly appointed Russian commander in Georgia, Prince Pavel Tsitsianov, of Georgian descent. In a warm letter sent to Tsitsianov, Alexander rejoiced in the fact that a "son of the Georgian soil" had been appointed as a commander and promised reconciliation provided the Georgian kingship was restored under the Russian protectorate. In response, Tsistianov, a loyal servant of the Russian Empire who saw no future for Georgia apart from Russia, sent General Vasily Gulyakov to the conquest of Char and Belokan, the mountainous communities sheltering Alexander and Teimuraz. Both fled to Tabriz and joined the ranks of the reformed Persian army, Alexander as a senior adviser to the Crown Prince Abbas Mirza and Teimuraz as a commander of artillery. As tensions were mounting along the Caucasus frontier, Alexander, along with Pir Quli Khan Qajar, was placed at the head of a Persian force in Ganja. When the Russo-Persian war broke out openly in June 1804, the Persian army under Abbas Mirza and Alexander fought the Russian troops inconclusively at Echmiadzin on 20 June 1804 and then successfully defended Erivan, forcing General Tsitsianov to withdraw back in Georgia in September 1804. At the same time, Alexander sent letters to all principal dignitaries in Georgia as well as the rebellious Georgian and Ossetian highlanders, promising them that he would be arriving with Persian armies to end the Russian rule.     

In 1810, Alexander joined the combined Persian-Ottoman venture of invasion of Georgia, also supported by Solomon II, the fugitive king of Imereti, and Leon, Alexander's nephew. However, the Ottoman mobilization was delayed and a Persian force was dispersed in a surprise nighttime attack by the Russians near Akhalkalaki in September 1810. Barely escaping from captivity, Alexander fell back to Tabriz and Solomon retired to Trabizond, where he, the last reigning Georgian king, died in 1815. Alexander's disillusioned nephew Teimuraz, prompted by his tutor the poet Petre Laradze, escaped from the Persian camp and surrendered to the Russian authorities.

Rebellion in Kakheti 

In September 1812, Alexander crossed into Kakheti with some 100 followers to invigorate an anti-Russian movement in the region. His force of Georgian rebels and Dagestani auxiliaries fought a series of engagements with the Russian troops until its final defeat at the hands of General Dimitri Orbeliani in November 1812. In the meantime, in October 1812, General Pyotr Kotlyarevsky decisively defeated Abbas Mirza's attempt to advance towards Georgia in the battle of Aslanduz. According to the British officer William Monteith, who knew Alexander personally and accompanied him during his raid into Georgia, the rebellious prince, finding it impossible to raise the means of paying his Lezgian auxiliaries, had to consent to their carrying of Georgian slaves. As a result, Alexander's army was disbanded and he fled to the Khevsur highlanders. The Russians under General Stahl proceeded with ravaging the Khevsur villages, putting Alexander into flight to the Avars and other mountainous tribes of the Caucasus. The Russian authorities vainly pressured the mountaineers into surrendering the fugitive prince; they evinced toward him, in the words of Monteith, "a fidelity equal to that of the Highlanders towards Charles Edward under similar circumstances after the battle of Culloden."

Alexander's association with the Avars gave origin to a legend widespread in the area in the 19th century, according to which Imam Shamil, the future leader of Caucasian resistance to the Russian expansion, was his natural son. Apollon Runovsky, an officer in charge of Shamil in captivity at Kaluga, claimed in his diaries that Shamil himself forged this legend in an attempt to win the support of Georgian highlanders.

Life in Persia 

In spite of a thorough Russian search, in September 1818, Alexander fought his way to Akhaltsikhe in the Ottoman territory. The Russian commander-in-chief Alexey Yermolov wanted Alexander if not alive, then dead so as to have his remains interred "with some honors" in Tiflis and preclude “all sorts of concoctions”. Pursuant to Yermolov's instructions, General Veliyaminov avoided directly encroaching on an Ottoman or Persian territory to kill Alexander so as not to tarnish Russia's image "in the eyes of all Europe", but authorized Colonel Ladinsky to bribe Alexander's Turkish companions or local guides to murder the prince. All these efforts failed and, after months of delay by the local Ottoman authorities, Alexander managed to safely reach Persia in January 1819.

The shah gave Alexander a pension and possession of some Armenian-populated villages in Salmas. With the help of his friend, Crown Prince Abbas Mirza, and the Armenian Catholicos Ephraim, Alexander married Mariam, a daughter of Sahak Aghamalyan, the secular chief (melik) of the Armenians of the Erivan Khanate. Both Alexander and the Persian government hoped that this marriage would secure Armenian support against the Russians. During his refuge life in Persia, Alexander maintained contacts with the European diplomats and travelers. Among these was the Jewish Christian missionary Joseph Wolff, whom Alexander met at his estate in Khosrova. The prince served to Wolff as a source of information about the genealogy of the Bagrationi dynasty, including a claim of descent from David, and the presence of the Jews in Georgia.

Sir Robert Ker Porter, who saw Alexander in Tabriz in 1819 and noted his "bold independence of spirit" and irreconcilability to the Russian possession of Georgia, compared the refuge prince to "the royal lion hunted from his hereditary waste, yet still returning to hover near, and roar in proud loneliness of his ceaseless threatening to the human strangers who had disturbed his reign". William Monteith recalled that Alexander "never showed any pride of birth, nor did he gave way to useless regrets for the loss of his fortune and princely dignity, though he had no hesitation in talking of his adventures, or giving any information that was asked for concerning them."

The problem of protection offered by Iran to Alexander was one of the main points at issue during the ambassadorial mission of Semyon I. Mazarovich, sent in 1819 by the Russian government to Iran as a permanent resident diplomatic mission, to which the young poet Alexander Griboyedov was also attached.

Later years 

Alexander continued his efforts to foment anti-Russian revolts in various provinces of Georgia. During the Russo-Persian war of 1826–1828, he was in the Char community, trying to mobilize the local clans for a planned invasion of Kakheti, which failed to materialize. A report in The Asiatic Journal from that period noted that Alexander, "one of the principal refugee chiefs" in Iran and "a man of an enterprize", had lost confidence among the Georgians who were suspicious of his use of Dagestani auxiliaries and showed no "disposition to rise on the present occasion against their rulers."

In 1832, a number of leading Georgian nobles and intellectuals plotted a coup against the Russian rule. According to their plan, the principal Russian officials were to be invited to a ball where they would be either arrested or killed. Then Alexander would be invited to assume the crown of Georgia, possibly as a constitutional monarch. Alexander corresponded with the conspirators and had his own agent among their numbers, but the prince considered himself too old to be directly involved and told the Georgians "to do what they liked". The plot was eventually betrayed and its leaders were rounded up by the Russian authorities. Having abandoned all hopes of returning to Georgia, Alexander continued to live as a private person and died in obscurity in Tehran in 1844. He was buried in the courtyard of St. Thaddeus and Bartholomew Armenian Church.

Family and descendants 

In the lifetime of his father, in 1790, Alexander was betrothed to the daughter of a Circassian chief from Greater Kabarda, of the Misostov clan. Monteith refers to her as Alexander's wife, but the girl, baptized in Georgia as Nino, died after her arrival in Tiflis before the marriage was effected.

Alexander married Mariam (12 August 1808 – 7 October 1882), a daughter of the Armenian dignitary Sahak Melik-Aghamalyan, in 1825 in Erivan. The Iranian governor of the Erivan Khanate, Hossein Khan Sardar, maintained good relations with Sahak and had played an instrumental role in arranging the marriage. Through her mother, Mariam was a cousin of the prominent Armenian writer Khachatur Abovian. In 1827 she, together with their son, Irakli, settled in her native Erivan, which was soon conquered by Russia. In 1834 the Russian government ordered her to move to Saint Petersburg, where she was known as tsarevna Maria Isaakovna Gruzinskaya (Russian for "of Georgia") and lived on a state-granted pension until her death in 1882. Mariam's remains were moved to Tiflis and interred there, at the northern wall of the Armenian Vank cathedral. After the demolition of the cathedral by the Soviet government in 1930, her marble gravestone with a trilingual Russian, Armenian, and Georgian epitaph was moved to the State Museum of the History of Georgia in Tiflis (now Tbilisi).

Alexander's son, Prince Irakli (18 August 1826 – 27 April 1882), pursued an officer's career in the Russian army. Irakli's only son of his marriage to Princess Tamar Chavchavadze, Alexander, died at the age of 2 in 1879. His daughters, Yelizaveta (1870–1942) and Yekaterina (1872–1917), were married to the princes Mamuka Orbeliani and Ivan Ratiev, respectively.

Alexander also had an illegitimate daughter, named Yelizaveta (13 July 1811 – 17 September 1836), who was the second wife of Samson-Khan (Samson Yakovlevich Makintsev; 1770–1853), a Russian defector and a high-ranking commander in the Qajar army. Samson's son of this marriage, Jibrail-Khan, subsequently served as an aide-de-camp to the shah Naser al-Din.

Ancestry

See also
Prince Teimuraz of Georgia
Iranian Georgians

Notes

References 

 

 

 

 

1770 births
1844 deaths
Bagrationi dynasty of the Kingdom of Kartli-Kakheti
Military personnel from Tbilisi
Georgian princes
Battle of Krtsanisi
18th-century people from Georgia (country)
19th-century people from Georgia (country)
Georgian emigrants to Iran
People of the Russo-Persian Wars
Burials in Iran
People of the Caucasian War
Rebellions against the Russian Empire
People of Qajar Iran